Pizza Land (spelled Pizzaland on its front sign and in press accounts, and as two words on a separate sign) is an American pizzeria at 260 Belleville Turnpike in North Arlington, New Jersey, which was featured in the opening credits of The Sopranos. Additionally, in Law & Order episode 10.6, "Marathon" (1999), a pizza box from the restaurant was used by a suspect to transport and conceal firearms. The pizzeria was opened in 1965 by Italian immigrant Fred Di Piazza,who passed it on to his adopted son, Tony Di Piazza. Around 2005, Al Pawlowicz purchased the restaurant. Following Pawlowicz’s death in 2010, the shop was closed for a year before being purchased by Eddie Twdroos.

References

1965 establishments in New Jersey
Restaurants established in 1965
Buildings and structures in Bergen County, New Jersey
Companies based in Bergen County, New Jersey
North Arlington, New Jersey
Pizzerias in the United States
Restaurants in New Jersey
The Sopranos